Dermatomyositis (DM) is a long-term inflammatory disorder which affects skin and the muscles. Its symptoms are generally a skin rash and worsening muscle weakness over time. These may occur suddenly or develop over months. Other symptoms may include weight loss, fever, lung inflammation, or light sensitivity. Complications may include calcium deposits in muscles or skin.

The cause is unknown. Theories include that it is an autoimmune disease or a result of a viral infection. Dermatomyositis may develop as a paraneoplastic syndrome associated with several forms of malignancy. It is a type of inflammatory myopathy. Diagnosis is typically based on some combination of symptoms, blood tests, electromyography, and muscle biopsies.

While no cure for the condition is known, treatments generally improve symptoms. Treatments may include medication, physical therapy, exercise, heat therapy, orthotics and assistive devices, and rest. Medications in the corticosteroids family are typically used with other agents such as methotrexate or azathioprine recommended if steroids are not working well. Intravenous immunoglobulin may also improve outcomes. Most people improve with treatment and in some, the condition resolves completely.

About one per 100,000 people per year are newly affected. The condition usually occurs in those in their 40s and 50s with women being affected more often than men. People of any age, however, may be affected. The condition was first described in the 1800s.

Signs and symptoms 
The main symptoms include several kinds of skin rash along with muscle weakness in both upper arms or thighs.

Skin 
One form the rashes take is called "heliotrope" (a purplish color) or lilac, but may also be red. It can occur around the eyes along with swelling, but also occurs on the upper chest or back what is called the "shawl" (around the neck) or "V-sign" above the breasts and may also occur on the face, upper arms, thighs, or hands.  Another form the rash takes is called Gottron's sign which are red or violet, sometimes scaly, slightly raised papules that erupt on any of the finger joints (the metacarpophalangeal joints or the interphalangeal joints). Gottron's papules may also be found over other bony prominences including the elbows, knees, or feet. All these rashes are made worse by exposure to sunlight, and are often very itchy, painful, and may bleed.

If a person exhibits only skin findings characteristic of DM, without weakness or abnormal muscle enzymes, then he or she may be experiencing amyopathic dermatomyositis (ADM), formerly known as "dermatomyositis sine myositis".

Muscles 
People with DM experience progressively worsening muscle weakness in the proximal muscles (for example, the shoulders and thighs). Tasks that use these muscles: standing from sitting, lifting, and climbing stairs, can become increasingly difficult for people with dermatomyositis.

Other 
Around 30% of people have swollen, painful joints, but this is generally mild.

In some people, the condition affects the lungs, and they may have a cough or difficulty breathing.  If the disease affects the heart,  arrhythmias may occur. If it affects the blood vessels in the stomach or intestines, which is more common in juvenile DM, the people might vomit blood, have black tarry bowel movements, or may develop a hole somewhere in their GI tract.

There are further complications possible with Dermatomyositis. These complications include difficulty swallowing due to the muscles in the esophagus being affected which can result in malnutrition and can cause the breathing of food or liquids, into the lungs.

Causes 

The cause is unknown, but it may result from an initial viral infection or cancer, either of which could raise an autoimmune response.

Between 7 and 30% of dermatomyositis cases arise from cancer, probably as an autoimmune response. The most commonly associated cancers are ovarian cancer, breast cancer, and lung cancer.  Between 18 and 25 per cent of people with amyopathic DM also have cancer. Malignancy in association with dermatomyositis is more prevalent after age 60.

Some cases are inherited, and HLA subtypes HLA-DR3, HLA-DR52, and HLA-DR6 seem to create a disposition to autoimmune dermatomyositis.

Diagnosis

The diagnosis of dermatomyositis is based on five criteria, which are also used to differentially diagnose with respect to polymyositis:

 Muscle weakness in both thighs or both upper arms
 Using a blood test, finding higher levels of enzymes found in skeletal muscle, including creatinine kinase, aldolase, and glutamate oxaloacetate, pyruvate transaminases and lactate dehydrogenase
 Using electromyography (testing of electric signalling in muscles), finding all three of: erratic, repetitive, high-frequency signals; short, low-energy signals between skeletal muscles and motor neurons that have multiple phases; and sharp activity when a needle is inserted into the muscle
 Examining a muscle biopsy under a microscope and finding mononuclear white blood cells between the muscle cells, and finding abnormal muscle cell degeneration and regeneration, dying muscle cells, and muscle cells being consumed by other cells (phagocytosis)
 Rashes typical of dermatomyositis, which include heliotrope rash, Gottron sign, and Gottron papules

The fifth criterion is what differentiates dermatomyositis from polymyositis; the diagnosis is considered definite for dermatomyositis if three of items 1 through 4 are present in addition to 5, probable with any two in addition to 5, and possible if just one is present in addition to 5.

Dermatomyositis is associated with autoantibodies, especially antinuclear antibodies (ANA).  Around 80% of people with DM test positive for ANA and around 30% of people have myositis-specific autoantibodies which include antibodies to aminoacyl-tRNA synthetases (anti-synthetase antibodies), including antibodies against histidine—tRNA ligase (Anti-Jo1); antibodies to signal recognition particle (SRP); and anti-Mi-2 antibodies.

Magnetic resonance imaging may be useful to guide muscle biopsy and to investigate involvement of internal organs; X-ray may be used to investigate joint involvement and calcifications.

A given case of dermatomyositis may be classified as amyopathic dermatomyositis if only skin is affected and no muscle weakness for longer than 6 months is seen according to one 2016 review, or two years according to another.

Classification
Dermatomyositis is a form of systemic connective tissue disorder, a class of diseases that often involves autoimmune dysfunction.

It has also been classified as an idiopathic inflammatory myopathy, along with polymyositis, necrotizing autoimmune myositis, cancer-associated myositis, and sporadic inclusion body myositis.

A form of this disorder that occurs prior to adulthood is known as juvenile dermatomyositis.

Treatment 
No cure for dermatomyositis is known, but the symptoms can be treated.  Options include medication, physical therapy, exercise, heat therapy (including microwave and ultrasound), orthotics and assistive devices, and rest.  The standard treatment for dermatomyositis is a corticosteroid drug, given either in pill form or intravenously.  Immunosuppressant drugs, such as azathioprine and methotrexate, may reduce inflammation in people who do not respond well to prednisone.  Periodic treatment using intravenous immunoglobulin can also improve recovery.  Other immunosuppressive agents used to treat the inflammation associated with dermatomyositis include cyclosporine A, cyclophosphamide, and tacrolimus.

Physical therapy is usually recommended to prevent muscle atrophy and to regain muscle strength and range of motion.  Many individuals with dermatomyositis may need a topical ointment, such as topical corticosteroids, for their skin disorder.  They should wear high-protection sunscreen and protective clothing.  Surgery may be required to remove calcium deposits that cause nerve pain and recurrent infections.

Antimalarial medications, especially hydroxychloroquine and chloroquine, are used to treat the rashes, as is done for similar conditions.

Rituximab is used when people do not respond to other treatments.

As of 2016, treatments for amyopathic dermatomyositis in adults did not have a strong evidence base; published treatments included antimalarial medications, steroids, taken or orally or applied to the skin, calcineurin inhibitors applied to the skin, dapsone, intravenous immunoglobulin, methotrexate, azathioprine, and mycophenolate mofetil.   None appears to be very effective; among them, intravenous immunoglobulin has had the best outcomes.

Prognosis 
Before the advent of modern treatments such as prednisone, intravenous immunoglobulin, plasmapheresis, chemotherapies, and other drugs, the prognosis was poor.

The cutaneous manifestations of dermatomyositis may or may not improve with therapy in parallel with the improvement of the myositis. In some people, the weakness and rash resolve together. In others, the two are not linked, with one or the other being more challenging to control. Often, cutaneous disease persists after adequate control of the muscle disease.

The risk of death from the condition is much higher if the heart or lungs are affected.

Epidemiology
Incidence of DM peaks at ages 40–50, but the disease can affect people of all ages. It tends to affect more women than men. The prevalence of DM ranges from one to 22 per 100,000 people.

History
The diagnostic criteria were proposed in 1975 and became widely adopted.  Amyopathic DM, also called DM sine myositis, was named in 2002.

People who died with dermatomyositis
 Opera singer Maria Callas (1923–1977) allegedly had dermatomyositis from 1975 until her death.
 Actor Laurence Olivier (1907–1989) had dermatomyositis from 1974 until his death.
 American football running back Ricky Bell (1955–1984), the runner-up for the Heisman Trophy in 1976, and the number-one pick in the NFL draft in 1977, died at the age of 29 from heart failure caused by this disease.
 Rob Buckman (1948–2011) a doctor, comedian, author, and the president of the Humanist Association of Canada.

Research
As of 2016, research was ongoing into causes for DM, as well as biomarkers;  clinical trials were ongoing for use of the following drugs in DM: ajulemic acid (Phase II), adrenocorticotropic hormone gel (Phase IV, open label), IMO-8400, an antagonist of Toll-like receptor 7,8 and 9 (Ph II), abatacept (Phase IV, open label), and sodium thiosulfate (Phase II).

References

External links 

Autoimmune diseases
Connective tissue diseases
Disorders of fascia
Steroid-responsive inflammatory conditions
Systemic connective tissue disorders
Wikipedia medicine articles ready to translate
Wikipedia neurology articles ready to translate
Idiopathic diseases